Morris House or Morris Farm may refer to:

in Canada
Morris House (Halifax)

in the United States
(by state, then city/town)
Morris House (Bentonville, Arkansas), listed on the National Register of Historic Places (NRHP) in Benton County
Morris House (Bradford, Arkansas), listed on the NRHP in White County, Arkansas
T.H. Morris House, Mammoth Spring, Arkansas, listed on the NRHP in Fulton County
Jim Morris Barn, Timbo, Arkansas, listed on the NRHP in Stone County
Wood-Morris-Bonfils House, Denver, Colorado, listed on the NRHP in downtown Denver
Morris House (New Haven, Connecticut), NRHP-listed
Johnson-Morris House, Newark, Delaware vicinity, NRHP-listed
Morris House (Washington, D.C.), NRHP-listed
Mote-Morris House, Leesburg, Florida, NRHP-listed
Morris-Butler House, Indianapolis, Indiana, NRHP-listed 
Dr. William Morris Office and House, Southville, Kentucky, listed on the NRHP in Shelby County
Joseph Henry Morris House, Jackson, Mississippi, listed on the NRHP in Hinds County
Wright Morris Boyhood House, Central City, Nebraska, NRHP-listed
Morris-Lull Farm, Morris, New York, NRHP-listed
Lewis G. Morris House, New York, NY, NRHP-listed
Morris-Jumel Mansion, New York, NY, NRHP-listed
Morris Mansion and Mill, Pemberton, New Jersey, NRHP-listed
Green Morris Farm, Charlotte, North Carolina, listed on the NRHP in Burlington County
Berryhill-Morris House, Bellbrook, Ohio, NRHP-listed
Morris House (Circleville, Ohio), NRHP-listed
Gill-Morris Farm, Circleville, Ohio, NRHP-listed
C.E. Morris House, Columbus, Ohio, listed on the NRHP in Franklin County
Morris House (Langston, Oklahoma), listed on the NRHP in Logan County
Deshler-Morris House, Philadelphia, Pennsylvania, NRHP-listed
Reynolds-Morris House, Philadelphia, Pennsylvania, NRHP-listed
Anthony Morris House, Norristown, Pennsylvania, NRHP-listed
Caldwell-Johnson-Morris Cottage, Anderson, South Carolina, NRHP-listed
W.W. Morris House, South Fulton, Tennessee, listed on the NRHP in Obion County
Morris-Browne House, Brownsville, Texas, listed on the NRHP in Cameron County
Glenn W. Morris House, Houston, Texas, listed on the NRHP in Harris County
Morris-Moore House, Paris, Texas, listed on the NRHP in Lamar County
Atkinson-Morris House, Paris, Texas, listed on the NRHP in Lamar County
Andrew James Morris House, Beaver, Utah, listed on the NRHP in Beaver County
Josie Bassett Morris Ranch Complex, Dinosaur National Monument, Utah, NRHP-listed
Richard Vaughen Morris House, Salt Lake City, Utah, NRHP-listed
Gen. Lewis R. Morris House, Springfield, Vermont, listed on the NRHP in Windsor County